A technology business incubator (or TBI) is a type of business incubator focused on organizations that help startup companies and individual entrepreneurs which use modern technologies as the primary means of innovation to develop their businesses by providing a range of services, including training, brokering and financing. In several countries, including India, China, and the Philippines there have been government initiatives to support TBIs. Organizations under the title of technology business incubator often receive funding or other forms of support from the national government.

Technology business incubators examples by region

India
 AMITY INNOVATION INCUBATOR
The Innovation Continuum
Indian Angel Network

Britain
Seed Camp
Entrepreneur First
Founders Institute

USA
 Y Combinator
 TechStars
 500 Startups

See also 
Technium
Technology Hub
Technology transfer

References 

Business incubators